Gábor Németh (born 21 May 1975) is a Hungarian football player who plays for Répcelaki SE.

Club career

Szombathelyi Haladás
Ha made his debut of 4 September 1996 against BVSC Budapest in a match that ended 2–1.

Vasas SC
He made his debut of 30 July 2005 against Győri ETO FC in a match that ended 1–2.

Budapest Honved
He made his debut of 25 July 2009 against Kaposvári Rákóczi FC in a match that ended 3–1.

Club honours

Videoton FC Fehérvár
Hungarian National Championship II:
Winner: 1999–00

Ferencvárosi TC
Hungarian National Championship I:
Winner: 2000–01
Runners-up: 2001–02

Vasas SC
Hungarian Cup:
Runners-up: 2005–06

Budapest Honvéd FC
Hungarian Super Cup:
Runners-up: 2009

Personal life
Németh was born on 21 May 1975 in Szombathely, Hungary.

References
Budapest Honved Official Website
Player profile at HLSZ

1975 births
Living people
Sportspeople from Szombathely
Hungarian footballers
Association football goalkeepers
Szombathelyi Haladás footballers
Fehérvár FC players
Ferencvárosi TC footballers
BFC Siófok players
Pécsi MFC players
Vasas SC players
Budapest Honvéd FC players
Kecskeméti TE players
Paksi FC players
Nemzeti Bajnokság I players
Nemzeti Bajnokság II players
21st-century Hungarian people